Ersephila indistincta is a species of geometrid moth in the family Geometridae. It is found in North America.

The MONA or Hodges number for Ersephila indistincta is 7279.

References

Further reading

 
 

Hydriomenini
Articles created by Qbugbot
Moths described in 1898